Khan family may refer to:

 Bahram Khan family
 Family of Imran Khan
 Family of Adil Khan
 Family tree of Genghis Khan
 Salim Khan family
 Khizr and Ghazala Khan, who spoke at the 2016 Democratic National Convention in the United States
 Khan family (squash), Pakistani family of squash players

See also
Khan (surname)